Anaïs, Anais or ANAIS may refer to:

People
Anaïs (given name), a female given name, especially popular in France and Greece (including a list of people with the name)
Anaïs (singer) (born 1965), French singer
Anaís (born 1984), Dominican Republic singer
Anaís (actress) (born 1974), Mexican actress

Places
 Anais, Charente, in the Charente department of France
 Anais, Charente-Maritime, in the Charente-Maritime department of France

Science
 ANAIS, a particle detector experiment designed to detect dark matter

See also
 Anaïs Anaïs, a perfume by the brand Cacharel that was launched in 1978
 Anahita